Let's Get Harry is a 1986 American adventure film directed by Stuart Rosenberg. It stars Michael Schoeffling, Thomas F. Wilson, Glenn Frey, Rick Rossovich, Ben Johnson, Mark Harmon, Gary Busey, and Robert Duvall. The film direction is credited to Alan Smithee, a pseudonym used by directors who repudiate their involvement in a film.

Plot
In Colombia, an American engineer named Harry Burck is overseeing the opening of his company's water pipeline. In the middle of the unveiling ceremony, a group of rebels arrives to kidnap an American diplomat who is in attendance. In the process, Harry is also kidnapped.

Word of the kidnapping reaches Harry's brother Corey and his friends Bob, Spence, and Kurt, who were all awaiting Harry's return. The men, coworkers at a factory, learn that Harry's kidnapping was orchestrated by a drug lord named Carlos Ochobar. Corey and Bob travel to Washington, D.C. to seek assistance from the U.S. government, only to be told that there are no plans to mount a rescue. Harry's father, Harry Burck, Sr., is despondent over the kidnapping of his son.

Kurt reminds his friends that they all personally owe Harry something, and that their only choice is to rescue him themselves. Despite some resistance and skepticism from Kurt and Spence, all the men eventually agree to go. Before heading to Colombia, they enlist the financial help of a sympathetic local car salesman, Jack, who insists on going along as a condition of funding the rescue, and the military expertise of a mercenary named Norman Shrike. Due to the urgency of the mission, Shrike is only able to give the group perfunctory training in military tactics.

Once in Colombia, the group encounters resistance, both from local officials and from the U.S. government. The group eventually lands in jail after being set up by one of Shrike's contacts who was going to supply them with weapons. They are handed over to U.S. officials and put on a plane back to the U.S. Just prior to takeoff, the group manages to escape, but Kurt decides to give up and go home.

The group resumes their trek toward Ochobar's camp. Eventually, they are engaged by rebels. Shrike is killed in a firefight while saving one of the men's lives. The group ventures on with the help of a local woman, Veronica, and they eventually find Ochobar's hideout. In the ensuing shootout with Ochobar's men, Jack is killed. The group is able to save Harry and escape, destroying Ochobar's camp in the process.

Harry and the men return home to a hero's welcome.

Cast

 Michael Schoeffling as Corey Burck
 Thomas F. Wilson as Bob Pachowski
 Rick Rossovich as Kurt Klein
 Ben Johnson as Harry Burck Sr.
 Glenn Frey as Spence
 Mark Harmon as Harry Burck Jr.
 Gary Busey as Jack
 Robert Duvall as Norman Shrike
 Elpidia Carrillo as Veronica
 Matt Clark as Walt Clayton
 Bruce Gray as Ambassador Douglas
 Jerry Hardin as Dean Reilly
 David Hess as Mercenary
 Pierrino Mascarino as Pinilla
 Gregory Sierra as Alphonso
 John Wesley as Mercenary
 Eusebio Dominguez as Elite Military

Production
In the director's cut of the film, Mark Harmon does not make an appearance of any kind until the final rescue sequence. Prior to the planned release, Harmon's popularity grew dramatically due to his work on St. Elsewhere and being named "Sexiest Man Alive" by People magazine, and the producers wanted to make Harmon more at the center of the story over Rosenberg's objection. Additional footage was shot featuring Harmon's abduction and being held as a hostage. As a result, Rosenberg renounced the film, deciding to be credited as Alan Smithee.

Release
The film was released on October 31, 1986, in 133 theatres regionally in the United States and grossed $140,980 for the weekend.

Let's Get Harry is currently only available on VHS and LaserDisc; it has not been released on DVD.

References

External links
 
 
 
 
 
 Let's Get Harry—Photos

1986 films
1986 action films
American action films
Films about Colombian drug cartels
Films directed by Stuart Rosenberg
Films credited to Alan Smithee
Films set in Colombia
Films set in Illinois
Films shot in Illinois
Films shot in Mexico
TriStar Pictures films
Films scored by Brad Fiedel
1980s English-language films
1980s American films